Derbyshire County Cricket Club in 1939 was the last cricket season before World War II, when the English club  Derbyshire had been playing for sixty-eight years. It was their forty first season in the County Championship and  they won ten matches in the Championship, to finish ninth.

1939 season
 
Derbyshire played 28 matches in the County Championship, one against  Oxford University and one against the touring West Indians. They won eleven matches altogether, ten in the County Championship. Robin Buckston was in his third season as captain.  Denis Smith scored most runs and Bill Copson took most wickets.

Nearly all the players had been members of the 1936 championship winning team and the only player to make his debut was Cliff Gladwin whose low scores and failure to take a wicket gave little inkling that he would turn out to be Derbyshire's main wicket-taker in the years after World War II.

Matches

{| class="wikitable" style="width:100%;"
|-
! style="background:#efefef;" colspan="6"| List of  matches
|- style="background:#efefef;"
!No.
!Date
!V
!Result 
!Margin
!Notes
|- 
|1
 |10 May 1939 
| |Oxford University    The University Parks, Oxford 
| style="background:#0f0;"|Won
| 163 runs
| W H Copson 5-12 and 5-9; Pether 5-7; A V Pope 5-30 
|- 
|2
|13 May 1939 
|  Surrey  Queen's Park, Chesterfield 
  |bgcolor="#FFCC00"|Drawn
|
| Gregory 5-46; W H Copson 5-47 
|- 
|3
|20 May 1939 
| Northamptonshire   County Ground, Derby 
| style="background:#0f0;"|Won
| 10 wickets
|  
|- 
|4
|27 May 1939 
| Warwickshire Edgbaston, Birmingham 
| style="background:#f00;"|Lost
| 71 runs
| Dollery 177; W H Copson 5-47; Hollies 6-48 and 5-79; T. B. Mitchell 5-112 
|- 
|5
|31 May 1939 
| Kent  Rutland Recreation Ground, Ilkeston 
| style="background:#0f0;"|Won
| 5 wickets
| W H Copson 5-39;  
|- 
|6
|03 Jun 1939 
| Lancashire   Old Trafford, Manchester 
| style="background:#f00;"|Lost
| Innings and 105 runs
| Paynter 222; Phillipson 5-38 
|- 
|7
|07 Jun 1939 
|  WorcestershireQueen's Park, Chesterfield 
| style="background:#0f0;"|Won
| 315 runs
| D Smith 123; A V Pope6-47 
|- 
|8
|10 Jun 1939 
| West Indies    County Ground, Derby 
| style="background:#fc0;"|Drawn
|
| W H Copson 6-73 
|- 
|9
|14 Jun 1939 
 |  Surrey Woodbridge Road, Guildford  
| style="background:#0f0;"|Won
| Innings and 43 runs
| Parker 6-34; A V Pope 6-44; G H Pope 5-46 
|- 
|10
|17 Jun 1939 
| Lancashire   Park Road Ground, Buxton 
| style="background:#fc0;"|Drawn
|
| T S Worthington 101 
|- 
|11
|21 Jun 1939 
| Leicestershire  Queen's Park, Chesterfield 
| style="background:#0f0;"|Won
| 9 wickets
| H Smith 5-64; L F Townsend  5-45 
|- 
|12
|24 Jun 1939 
| Yorkshire  Bramall Lane, Sheffield 
| style="background:#f00;"|Lost
| 276 runs
| Barber 100; G H Pope 6-44; Smurthwaite 5-7; Smailes 10-47
|- 
|13
|28 Jun 1939 
|  Sussex    County Ground, Derby 
| style="background:#f00;"|Lost
| 13 runs
| T S Worthington 119; W H Copson 6-64; Duffield 5-38; Langridge 3-5Langridge scored a hat-trick  
|- 
|14
|01 Jul 1939 
| Essex   Queen's Park, Chesterfield 
| style="background:#0f0;"|Won
| 10 wickets
| W H Copson 6-57; Stephenson 6-41 
|- 
|15
|08 Jul 1939 
| Nottinghamshire    Trent Bridge, Nottingham 
| style="background:#fc0;"|Drawn
|
| T. B. Mitchell 5-70 
|- 
|16
|12 Jul 1939 
| Middlesex   County Ground, Derby 
| style="background:#0f0;"|Won
| 6 wickets
| W H Copson 7-39 
|- 
|17
|15 Jul 1939 
| Yorkshire  Queen's Park, Chesterfield 
| style="background:#fc0;"|Drawn
|
|  
|- 
|18
|19 Jul 1939 
|  Worcestershire Tipton Road, Dudley 
| style="background:#fc0;"|Drawn
|
| D Smith 132 
|- 
|19
|22 Jul 1939 
| SomersetCounty Ground, Derby 
| style="background:#fc0;"|Drawn
|
| Buse 5-76; G H Pope 5-59; T. B. Mitchell 5-66; Andrews 5-45 
|- 
|20
|26 Jul 1939 
| Middlesex     Lord's Cricket Ground, St John's Wood 
| style="background:#f00;"|Lost
| Innings and 24 runs
| Denis Compton 214; Sims 8-32 and 5-128  
|- 
|21
|29 Jul 1939 
| Kent  Bat and Ball Ground, Gravesend 
| style="background:#f00;"|Lost
| 171 runs
| Ames 159; Todd 106; Harding 5-56 
|- 
|22
|02 Aug 1939 
|  Gloucestershire  Queen's Park, Chesterfield 
| style="background:#fc0;"|Drawn
|
| Scott 7-63; T. B. Mitchell 6-71 
|- 
|23
|05 Aug 1939 
| Warwickshire  Ind Coope Ground, Burton-on-Trent 
| style="background:#fc0;"|Drawn
|
| Grove 5-78 
|- 
|24
|09 Aug 1939 
| Northamptonshire   County Ground, Northampton 
| style="background:#fc0;"|Drawn
|
| Brookes 101; G H Pope 6-38 
|- 
|25
|12 Aug 1939 
| Essex    Southchurch Park, Southend-on-Sea 
| style="background:#f00;"|Lost
| Innings and 31 runs
| Nichols 6-18 and 5-26; Farnes 5-52 
|- 
|26
|16 Aug 1939 
|  Gloucestershire    College Ground, Cheltenham 
| style="background:#0f0;"|Won
| 1 run
| W H Copson 5-45;A V Pope 5-25; Lambert 6-69; T. B. Mitchell 5-75 
|- 
|27
|19 Aug 1939 
| Nottinghamshire    Rutland Recreation Ground, Ilkeston 
| style="background:#0f0;"|Won
| 147 runs
| G H Pope 121 
|- 
|28
|23 Aug 1939 
|  Sussex    The Saffrons, Eastbourne 
| style="background:#f00;"|Lost
| Innings and 39 runs
| T. B. Mitchell 8-149 Nye 5-49 
|- 
|29
|26 Aug 1939 
| SomersetCounty Ground, Taunton 
| style="background:#0f0;"|Won
| 7 wickets
| A F Townsend  142; Buse 8-41 
|- 
|30
|30 Aug 1939 
| Leicestershire  Aylestone Road, Leicester 
| style="background:#fc0;"|Drawn
|
| Sperry 7-48; W H Copson  6-39 
|- 
|

Statistics

County Championship batting averages

County Championship bowling averages

Wicket Keeper

Harry Elliott Catches 48,  Stumping 11 
Albert Alderman Catches 17, Stumping 1

See also
Derbyshire County Cricket Club seasons
1939 English cricket season

References

1939 in English cricket
Derbyshire County Cricket Club seasons
English cricket seasons in the 20th century